Lumberjacks is the hip hop duo between T-Mo and Khujo of the Atlanta rapping pioneers Goodie Mob. The Lumberjacks were put together before the entire Goodie Mob group. Khujo and T-Mo formed a duo in high school before joining Cee-Lo and Big Gipp later to form the aforementioned supergroup. They never released an album under the "Lumberjacks" moniker though until 2005 with Livin' Life as Lumberjacks, which failed to chart. They released this album after the three-member album One Monkey Don't Stop No Show which was after Cee-Lo left to pursue a solo career.

Albums
 2005 - Livin' Life as Lumberjacks

Southern hip hop groups
American hip hop groups
American musical duos
Hip hop duos
Musical groups from Georgia (U.S. state)
Dungeon Family members